South Louisiana Community College (SLCC) (French: Collège communautaire de la Louisiane du Sud) is a public community college in Lafayette, Louisiana.  It was established in 1997 to provide academic and vocational training.

Its service area includes Acadia, Evangeline, Iberville, Lafayette, Pointe Coupee, St. Landry, and Vermilion parishes, as well as the northern part of St. Martin Parish.

In July 2012, SLCC merged with the Acadiana Technical Colleges, thereby making SLCC a comprehensive community college with campuses in eight parishes. It is one of the largest community colleges in Louisiana with more than 7,000 students enrolled. SLCC awards associate degrees, transfer degrees, technical diplomas and certifications.

SLCC received approval from the Louisiana Nursing Board and Louisiana Board of Regents to offer a Registered Nursing program. The program is an Associate of Science in Nursing (ASN) and began in Spring 2014 with 40 students. In July 2018, Young Memorial in Morgan City, LA, was added as an SLCC Campus.

Campus 
South Louisiana Community College has 3 buildings on the main Lafayette campus, as well as branch campuses in nearby cities. The Devalcourt Building contains the main lobby of the college, as well as 3 floors with classrooms. The Ardoin Building, named after Ted Ardoin, houses the welding department and many other technical training programs, as well as Financial Aid. In 2016, a new building was erected, containing 3 floors, known as the Health and Sciences building. This contains the Nursing Program, as well as the Administrative Suite and other classrooms.

Schools of Choice
Lafayette Parish School System (LPSS) added a "School of Choice" called the Early College Academy in 2008, which gives high school students (grades 9-12) a chance to graduate with a high school diploma as well as a two-year associate degree in the field of their choice. Students take all courses on the campus of South Louisiana Community College, and most school days begin at 8:30  and end around 4 p.m. It is the only school of its kind in the state of Louisiana.

References

External links
 

Community colleges in Louisiana
Educational institutions established in 1997
Universities and colleges accredited by the Southern Association of Colleges and Schools
Education in Lafayette Parish, Louisiana
Education in Iberia Parish, Louisiana
Education in St. Mary Parish, Louisiana
Buildings and structures in Lafayette, Louisiana
Buildings and structures in Iberia Parish, Louisiana
Buildings and structures in St. Mary Parish, Louisiana
Education in Lafayette, Louisiana
1997 establishments in Louisiana
Educational institutions accredited by the Council on Occupational Education